Horse Brook is a river in Delaware County, New York. It drains Lake Mimi and flows south before converging with Beaver Kill northwest of Roscoe.

References

Rivers of New York (state)
Rivers of Delaware County, New York
Tributaries of the East Branch Delaware River